The University of Kordofan (Arabic: جامعة كردفان ) (informally Kordofan University) is one of the largest universities in Sudan located in El-Obeid 560 km to the southwest of Khartoum. It was founded in 1990 and is recognized as one of the top universities in Sudan. It features several institutes, academic units and research centres, including the Institute of Gum Arabic Research and Desertification Studies, the Centre for Intermediate Technology in Agriculture and a Deanship for Scientific Research and Postgraduate Studies. It is a member of the Federation of the Universities of the Islamic World.

Admission 
Undergraduate admission policy is governed by the national Board of Higher Education of Sudan, which sets the minimum admission requirement for secondary school students based on their national origin (Sudanese vs. non-Sudanese) and the secondary-school certificate board.

Faculties
Deanship for Research and Postgraduate Training
Faculty of Natural Resources and Environmental Studies
Faculty of Medicine and Health Sciences
Faculty of Nursing
Faculty of Commercial Studies and Business Administration
Faculty of Computer Science & Statistic
Faculty of Education
Faculty of Engineering and Technical Studies
Faculty of Science
Faculty of Arts
Faculty of Community
Institute of Gum Arabic Research and Desertification Studies 
Center for Peace & Development
Center for Information Unit

Faculty of Medicine and Health Sciences 
The Faculty of Medicine grants the degree of Bachelor of Medicine, Bachelor of Surgery after finishing six years of studying. With its community-based system, it pays great interest to community medicine, as it starts in the first year and finishes by the end of the fifth year of study. The first batch of students was admitted in 1992; by 2010, 13 batches had graduated and in 2010 the junior batch has the number 20.

Clinical training takes part in hospitals in the city of El-Obeid and other rural hospitals in the State of North Kordofan:

 El-Obeid Teaching Hospital
 Al-Kuwaiti Hospital for Children, El-Obeid
 Police Hospital, El-Obeid
 Army Forces Hospital, El-Obeid

The department of Medical Laboratory grants its enrolled students the degree of Bachelor of Medical Laboratory Science after finishing four years of study. Those who qualify for the fifth year will graduate with an honours degree.

The Department of Public Health grants its graduates the degree of Bachelor of Public Health after finishing four years of study.

Faculty of Natural Resource and Environmental Studies 
Faculty of Natural Resource and Environmental Studies grants bachelor's degree in a number of disciplines, such as
 Agricultural Economics and Rural Development
 Animal Science
 Forestry and Pasture
 Biochemistry
 Food Science
 Crop Production and Agricultural Extension

Libraries 

The University of Kordofan Library has four branches that are divided on the campus according to the faculties. The main library resides in the central campus and serves students from all other campuses, as it has a wide variety of sources and textbooks. Attached to each library is a computer lab that serves as an online source of knowledge.

Notable alumni 

 Sharif Sheikh Ahmed, a Somali politician who served as President of Somalia from 2009 to 2012.
 Mohamed Nagi Alassam, a Sudanese pro-democracy activist and physician who was the spokesman of the Sudanese Professionals Association.

References

 
Universities and colleges in Sudan
Educational institutions established in 1990
Forestry education
University of Kordofan
1990 establishments in Sudan
El-Obeid